KCII may refer to:

 KCII (AM), a radio station (1380 AM) licensed to Washington, Iowa, United States
 KCII-FM, a radio station (106.1 FM) licensed to Washington, Iowa, United States
 Choteau Airport (ICAO code KCII)